Walter Cecil "Dub" Williams, Jr. (November 26, 1927 – October 27, 2014), was an American politician who was a Republican member of the New Mexico House of Representatives from 1995 to 2009. Williams attended New Mexico State University and was a teacher, farmer and rancher. He lived in Glencoe, New Mexico. Williams died at his home in 2014 at the age of 86.

References

1927 births
2014 deaths
People from Bogalusa, Louisiana
People from Lincoln County, New Mexico
New Mexico State University alumni
Businesspeople from New Mexico
Republican Party members of the New Mexico House of Representatives
20th-century American businesspeople